John MacGregor Salter (3 August 1898 – 21 June 1982) was an Anglo-Scottish professional footballer who made one Football League appearance as an inside forward for Southampton in 1923.

Football career
Salter was born in Bitterne, Southampton and was enlisted in the British Army during the First World War. During the war he suffered from gas poisoning and never made a full recovery, finding regular daily training exhausting.

Having played local football with Bitterne Sports, he was signed by Southampton of the Football League Second Division in October 1923. He made his debut when he replaced Henry Johnson as inside left for the match at Fulham on 10 November 1923. The match ended in a 3–2 defeat and Salter was replaced by Len Andrews for the next match.

With only the one first-team appearance to his name, Salter was released in the summer of 1924 and took up employment with Thornycroft shipbuilders at Woolston.

References

External links
Career details on www.11v11.com

1898 births
1982 deaths
Footballers from Southampton
Scottish footballers
Association football forwards
Southampton F.C. players
English Football League players
Thornycrofts (Woolston) F.C. players